(Hawaiian for The Maui Strong Warriors) were an independent professional baseball team based out of Wailuku, Maui, Hawaii and champions of the Pacific Association of Professional Baseball Clubs.  They made their debut in the 2010 season with the Golden Baseball League in an away game, visiting the Victoria Seals on May 21, 2010, and played their home games at Maehara Stadium in Wailuku on the island of Maui.

On December 23, 2009, Michael Cummings, the CEO of XnE, Inc., which founded the team, announced the hiring of former St. George RoadRunners skipper Cory Snyder as the first manager and the signing of 30-year-old GBL veteran Mark Okano. The team also signed 2009 Golden Baseball League All-Star Fehlandt Lentini. The team's colors were black, green, yellow and red in keeping with the spirit of the islands.

In late August 2010,  was acquired by a new ownership group, Hawaii Baseball LLC, based out of Los Angeles that foreclosed as XnE defaulted on a loan that pledged the assets of the team as collateral.  On December 16, 2010, Maui hired Garry Templeton as their new manager months after he led the Chico Outlaws to their second GBL title.

The team joined the North American League in 2011, but that league folded in 2012 and they became charter members of the four-team Pacific Association of Professional Baseball Clubs. 

In 2013, Jeff Brooks was hired as their manager. Maui started their season by hosting two three games series against the Ishikawa Million Stars and Shinano Grandserows who are members of the Japanese independent Baseball Challenge League. In late July, Na Koa Ikaika traveled to Japan to play six games, one each against Fukui Miracle Elephants, Toyama Thunderbirds, Ishikawa Million Stars, Shinano Grandserows, Gunma Diamond Pegasus and Niigata Albirex Baseball Club. On August 25th, Maui defeated the Vallejo Admirals 8-3 to advance to the championship game vs. the San Rafael Pacifics who they defeated 6-1 that same day.

The team shut down operations after playing the 2013 Pacific Association season due to the travel costs of bringing in the teams from Northern California.

Season-by-season results

Notable alumni

 Cory Snyder (2010)
 Jerry Spradlin (2010)
 Jamie Vermilyea (2010,2012)
 Eri Yoshida (2011-2013)
 Danny Sandoval (2012)
 Chris Waters (baseball) (2013)

References

External links
  official website
 Press release announcing Maui's membership in the GBL

Pacific Association of Professional Baseball Clubs teams
Baseball teams established in 2009
Golden Baseball League teams
North American League teams
Sports in Maui
Professional baseball teams in Hawaii
2009 establishments in Hawaii
Baseball teams disestablished in 2013
2013 disestablishments in Hawaii
Defunct independent baseball league teams
Defunct baseball teams in Hawaii